Massies Creek is a stream located entirely within Greene County, Ohio. It is a tributary of the Little Miami River.

Massies Creek was named for Nathaniel Massie, a government surveyor. Variant names include Masseys Creek, Massicks Creek and Massie Creek.

See also
List of rivers of Ohio

References

Rivers of Greene County, Ohio
Rivers of Ohio